is a Japanese four-panel manga series written and illustrated by Akane, based on Bandai Namco Games' The Idolmaster franchise. The series revolves around the daily lives of the idols of 765 Production as they are joined by miniaturized versions of themselves known as Puchidols. The manga began serialization in the September 2008 issue of ASCII Media Works' Dengeki Maoh magazine. An original net animation (ONA) series by Gathering was streamed online between January and March 2013, with a second season streamed between April and June 2014.

Plot and characters

Puchidols

The Puchidol version of Yukiho Hagiwara. A timid Puchidol who enjoys tea and often takes rests, either in boxes or holes that she has dug herself. She grows a tanuki tail when it is cold.

The Puchidol version of Miki Hoshii. A cheeky Puchidol who loves eating onigiri; she sleeps so heavily that onigiri is the only reliable way to wake her up. Her hair turns brown and shorter in the summer.

The Puchidol version of Chihaya Kisaragi. A Puchidol who enjoys skinship with flat-chested girls but is violent towards larger chested girls, the exception being Ritsuko. In the winter, her hair grows to great lengths, also forming cat-like ears.

The Puchidol version of Haruka Amami. She is similar to Gremlins in that she multiplies when coming into contact with water, hates bright sunlight, and turns vicious when eating snacks after midnight. She also changes into a larger version often used as transport when in a large body of water.

The Puchidol version of Yayoi Takatsuki. A curious Puchidol who reacts to the sound of money being dropped, often seen catching a 10 yen coin after one bounce. Her hair puffs out during cold weather and she grows bamboo shoots in the spring.

The Puchidol version of Ritsuko Akizuki. Like Ritsuko, she is a busy worker and is often ordering the other Puchidols around.
 

The Puchidol versions of Ami and Mami Futami. A pair of mischievous Puchidols who love to play pranks on others.

The Puchidol version of Kotori Otonashi. A very capable Puchidol who is better at her job than Kotori herself. She is also able to fly.

The Puchidol version of Makoto Kikuchi. A tough Puchidol who is incredibly strong and also has healing powers. She often gains weight due to Makoto overfeeding her.

The Puchidol version of Azusa Miura. A ditzy Puchidol who has the habit of teleporting herself, and anyone near her, to a random location upon hearing sharp noises.

The Puchidol version of Iori Minase. A tsundere Puchidol who is capable of firing laser beams from her forehead.

The Puchidol version of Hibiki Ganaha. An easily-frightened Puchidol who summons various animals whenever she starts crying or gets frightened.

The Puchidol version of Takane Shijou. A refined Puchidol who mainly communicates in writing kanji and loves eating ramen.

Media

Manga
Puchimas! Petit Idolmaster is a four-panel comic strip manga series written and illustrated by Akane. It started serialization in the September 2008 issue of ASCII Media Works' Dengeki Maoh magazine. The first tankōbon volume was published on November 27, 2009, and 12 volumes have been released as of December 27, 2019.

Anime

A 64-episode original net animation (ONA) adaptation began streaming on Animate.tv and Niconico every weekday between January 1 and March 29, 2013. Funimation began simulcasting the series on January 14, 2013. The episodes were released on three Blu-ray Disc (BD) and DVD compilation volumes between March 27 and May 29, 2013. An original video animation (OVA) episode was bundled with Dengeki Maoh on October 27, 2012. Another OVA, titled , was released consisting of six episodes; three bundled with the limited edition of the fifth manga volume released on March 27, 2013, and three included in each BD/DVD volume of the series.  A second season, titled , was streamed on Niconico for 74 episodes between April 1 and June 30, 2014 and was also simulcast by Funimation.

References

2008 manga
2013 anime ONAs
2014 anime ONAs
ASCII Media Works manga
Bandai Namco franchises
Comedy anime and manga
Funimation
Gathering
Japanese idols in anime and manga
Kadokawa Dwango franchises
Seinen manga
The Idolmaster
Yonkoma